The Shan–Thai  or Sibumasu Terrane is a mass of continental crust extending from Tibet into Southeast Asia sharing a similar geological history. The Shan–Thai Terrane rifted from Australia in the Permian and collided with the Indochina terrane in the Triassic.  It extends from Malaysia, through peninsular Thailand, Myanmar, West Yunnan, to Lhasa.

It is one of a series of continental blocks or terranes that were rifted off eastern Gondwana during the Ordovician, long before the formation of Pangaea. Today these blocks form south-east Asia but the different timing of their journeys has given them distinct geologic histories.

Shan–Thai was an archipelago on the Paleo-Tethys Ocean spread over several latitudes.  It can therefore be subdivided into several portions with different palaeo-geographical histories.  The internal "Thai" elements, bordering the Indochina block, are of Cathaysian type and characterised by palaeo-tropical warm-water facies. The external "Shan" part has Gondwanan cold-water facies whilst the central "Sibumasu" part is transitional between the other two.
The internal parts of Shan–Thai merged with Laurasia  when the Nan-Uttaradit suture closed.
Oceanic basins separated the other elements of Shan–Thai until the Late Triassic–Early Jurassic Late Indochina Orogeny.

The collision between India and Eurasia during the Oligocene and Miocene resulted in clockwise rotation of south-west Asia, severe deformation of south-east Asia, and the extrusion of Shan–Thai and Indochina blocks.  These two blocks are still crisscrossed by the faults from this collision.

See also

References
 Notes

 Sources

 
 
 
 
 
 

Tectonic plates
Historical tectonic plates
Historical geology
Permian geology
Terranes